Captain Salt in Oz (1936) is the thirtieth in the series of Oz novels created by L. Frank Baum and his successors, and the sixteenth written by Ruth Plumly Thompson. It was illustrated by John R. Neill.

Captain Samuel Salt (from Pirates in Oz) sails the Nonestic Ocean and discovers Ozamaland, a legendary land of flying animals, as well as the famous White City of Om, and other places.

Captain Salt in Oz is a rare Oz book whose action takes place entirely outside the land of Oz and deals only indirectly with its inhabitants. (Compare Baum's Rinkitink in Oz, another volume in the series with a limited connection to Oz.)  Salt goes from island to island, claiming them in Princess Ozma's name.

In Chapter 19 of Pirates in Oz, Ozma declares, "I hereby decree that Samuel Salt shall give up piracy and become our Royal Discoverer and Explorer, take possession of new countries and set the flag of Oz on far islands and mountain tops." Salt cites Ozma regularly in his claiming (some would say conquering) of Nonestic islands, though some fans find this out of character for her, some even suggesting madness on the part of Salt, though that is clearly not in line with Thompson's intentions.

Captain Salt in Oz was the first Oz book to be published without any color illustrations since The Road to Oz in 1909. Reilly & Lee would continue to publish all remaining Oz titles without color illustrations, eventually including reprints of earlier Baum and Thompson titles.

References

External links
 
 A discussion of Captain Salt in Oz by Oz fans

1936 American novels
1936 children's books
1936 fantasy novels
Nautical novels
Oz (franchise) books